Retlaw is an unincorporated community located in the Municipal District of Taber, Alberta, Canada. The community once had a peak population of over 250 citizens and was even incorporated under the status of a village until it was dissolved into a hamlet under the jurisdiction of Improvement District No. 96 on March 1, 1939. Retlaw is located 2 km (1 mi) west of  Highway 864 6 km (3 mi) west of Vauxhall and 42 km (26 mi) northwest of Taber and 75 km (46 mi) southwest of Brooks.

History 

In 1910, the original post-office in the region was originally called "Barney."  Three years later, when the Canadian Pacific Railway station arrived, however, it was dubbed "Retlaw".  The name was selected as a tribute to Walter R. Baker, a CPR official, as "Retlaw" is "Walter" spelled backwards.

Retlaw was expected to be a large community in its area, with features of similarly sized communities of its time including four grain elevators, a pool hall, hotel, CPR railway station, churches, blacksmith, and a number of other businesses.  Due to the Province of Alberta bringing an irrigation canal that passed the nearby Town of Vauxhall in the 1920s, Retlaw was left in a dry land state causing the community to die off. By 1925 most of the Retlaw's inhabitants moved out into neighbouring communities, searching for a better way of life, some even bringing their homes and business with them. By 1957, only two families were left. Today very little is left of Retlaw. Only the restored Retlaw Union/United Church, a community centre, two houses, the blacksmith shop and a few foundations remain.

Retlaw Union/United Church 
Retlaw Church is an old Victorian style church located in the hamlet of Retlaw, Alberta. The church was built in the 1910s. The church, like the town, had sat empty and neglected for many years until the 1980s when local farmers came together and restored the church to its former glory. Every year the church holds family events such as Christmas dinners, plays, and church services on Sunday.

See also 
List of communities in Alberta
List of former urban municipalities in Alberta
List of ghost towns in Alberta
List of geographic names derived from anagrams and ananyms

References

External links 
Municipal District of Taber - Official site

Ghost towns in Alberta
Former villages in Alberta
Localities in the Municipal District of Taber
Populated places established in 1913
1913 establishments in Alberta